Lucassie Etungat (April 15, 1951–missing since June 29, 2016) is an Inuit sculptor.

Early life 
Etungat was born on April 15, 1951, in Pangnirtung, Nunavut.

Career 
His work is held at several museums, including the University of Michigan Museum of Art, the National Gallery of Canada, and the Montana Museum of Art and Culture.

Disappearance and aftermath 
Etungat was last seen on June 29, 2016, and was reported missing on September 1, 2016. At the time, he had been living in Iqaluit.

In July 2018, two fishermen found Etungat's identification card and jacket on Long Island in Koojesse Inlet. A 2019 article reported that the RCMP believe that he died in hunting mishap, but this is unconfirmed.

See also
List of people who disappeared

References 

1951 births
2010s missing person cases
20th-century Canadian male artists
20th-century Canadian sculptors
21st-century Canadian male artists
21st-century Canadian sculptors
Artists from Nunavut
Canadian male sculptors
Inuit from Nunavut
Inuit sculptors
Missing people
Missing person cases in Canada
People from Pangnirtung